The German composer Carl Maria von Weber (1786–1826) is best known for his operas, of which he wrote 10 between 1798 and 1826. His first four exist in various states: Die Macht der Liebe und des Weins ( 1798) is completely lost; two fragments survive for Das Waldmädchen (1800); the libretto to Peter Schmoll und seine Nachbarn (1803) is lost; and only three numbers from Rübezahl ( 1804–05) survive. Weber's mature operas—Silvana (1810), Abu Hassan  (1811), Der Freischütz (1821), Die drei Pintos ( 1820–21), Euryanthe (1823), Oberon (1826)—all survive intact; they were all performed within his lifetime, except Die drei Pintos which was posthumously completed by Gustav Mahler. His contributions to the genre were crucial in the development of German Romantische Oper (German Romantic Opera) and its national identity, exhibiting much influence on Richard Wagner. Der Freischütz, his most famous and significant work, remains among the most revered German operas.

After his family moved to Munich in 1798, the 13 year old Weber began study with Johann Nepomuk Kalcher, under whose supervision he wrote his first opera, the Singspiel Die Macht der Liebe und des Weins; the work was never performed. Two years later in Freiburg, he embarked on his second opera, Das Waldmädchen, to a libretto by Carl von Steinsberg, whose traveling company premiered it the same year. The two surviving fragments of the work show little sophistication, although it received moderate success. Weber's next opera, Peter Schmoll und seine Nachbarn, was written in Salzburg under the supervision of Michael Haydn to a libretto by Josef Türk after Carl Gottlob Cramer's popular novel of the same name. Premiered in 1803 in Augsburg, the work did not match the novel's popularity and was subsequently forgotten. In 1804 Weber was appointed Kapellmeister at the Breslau Opera and worked with a libretto by the theatre’s director Johann Gottlieb Rhode (after a story by Johann Karl August Musäus), to produce Rübezahl. The work was never performed and the three extant fragments show little improvement in his craft. After his two year tenure, Weber spent time in modern-day Pokój, Opole Voivodeship and eventually moved to Stuttgart where he began Silvana.

Weber's first operatic success came with Silvana, on a libretto by  that was reworked from Steinsberg's earlier one to Das Waldmädchen. While its initial premiere in 1810 in Frankfurt was only moderately successful, a Berlin premiere was very well received. When in Stuttgart, Weber and Hiemer had also begun a short Singspiel based on One Thousand and One Nights, Abu Hassan, which premiered in 1811 Munich to a second success for Weber. His operatic composition paused following his appointment as director of the Opera in Prague, but resumed in 1817 when he became director of the Dresden Opera and began work on Der Freischütz, based on Johann Apel's and Friedrich Laun's adaptation of the Freischütz tale. Briefly interrupted by a canceled royal commission for an opera entitled Alcindor, Der Freischütz premiered in 1821 in Berlin with a libretto by Johann Friedrich Kind and was extremely well received. Weber immediately began writing the Komische oper (comic opera) Die drei Pintos, to a libretto by Theodor Hell after  novel Der Brautkampf, but put it aside when the success of Der Freischütz led to a commission from the prestigious Kärntnertortheater in Vienna. Die drei Pintos was left incomplete for the remainder of his life. His widow later approached Weber's friend and composer Giacomo Meyerbeer about completing the work; he did nothing with the sketches for 20 years. Eventually, Weber's grandson, revised the text, and Mahler completed the music, premiering the work in 1888 at the Neues Stadttheater, Leipzig. The Kärntnertortheater commission resulted in the Grosse Heroisch-Romantische Oper (Great Heroic-Romantic opera) Euryanthe, on a libretto by Helmina von Chézy after a 13th-century French romance, which premiered at the Kärntnertortheater in 1823 to much praise. Weber's fame from Der Freischütz led to another important commission, this time from the Royal Opera House, London. For this he composed his final opera and only one in English, Oberon, to a libretto by James Planché, based on  Christoph Martin Wieland's epic poem of the same name. The work received much acclaim. Weber died in London less than two months later.

List of operas

Notes

References

Sources

  
  
  
 
 
 

 
Weber
German-language operas